The 2010–11 Sacramento Kings season was the 66th season of the franchise, its 26th season in Sacramento, and its 62nd season in the National Basketball Association (NBA).

Key dates
 June 24 – The 2010 NBA draft was held in New York City.
 July 1 – The free agency period began.

Summary

NBA Draft 2010

Free agency

Draft picks

Roster

Roster Notes
 Marquis Daniels did not suit up for any of the Kings' games, but he was on the team roster at the end of the season.

Pre-season

Game log

|- bgcolor="#ccffcc"
| 1
| October 5
| Phoenix
| 
| Tyreke Evans (26)
| DeMarcus Cousins (16)
| Tyreke Evans (5)
| ARCO Arena9,485
| 1–0
|- bgcolor="#ffcccc"
| 2
| October 7
| L.A. Clippers
| 
| DeMarcus Cousins (15)
| Jason Thompson,Omri Casspi,Carl Landry (5)
| Jason Thompson (3)
| ARCO Arena10,284
| 1–1
|- bgcolor="#ffcccc"
| 3
| October 10
| @ Golden State
| 
| DeMarcus Cousins (17)
| Jason Thompson (12)
| Francisco García,Omri Casspi,Luther Head (4)
| Oracle Arena10,537
| 1–2
|- bgcolor="#ccffcc"
| 4
| October 12
| Golden State
| 
| DeMarcus Cousins (20)
| Omri Casspi (9)
| Eugene Jeter (7)
| Oracle Arena10,786
| 2–2
|- bgcolor="#ffcccc"
| 5
| October 13
| @ L.A. Lakers
| 
| Carl Landry (23)
| DeMarcus Cousins (10)
| Tyreke Evans (8)
| Thomas & Mack Center15,134
| 2–3
|- bgcolor="#ccffcc"
| 6
| October 19
| @ L.A. Clippers
| 
| Omri Casspi,Tyreke Evans (17)
| Omri Casspi (8)
| Tyreke Evans (7)
| Staples Center10,838
| 3–3
|- bgcolor="#ffcccc"
| 7
| October 22
| @ Utah
| 
| Beno Udrih (17)
| Donté Greene,Jason Thompson,Carl Landry (6)
| Tyreke Evans (8)
| EnergySolutions Arena19,505
| 3–4
|-

Regular season

Standings

Record vs. opponents

Game log

|- bgcolor="#ccffcc"
| 1
| October 27
| @ Minnesota
| 
| Francisco García,Carl Landry (22)
| Carl Landry (11)
| Beno Udrih (6)
| Target Center17,067
| 1–0
|- bgcolor="#ffcccc"
| 2
| October 29                 
| @ New Jersey
| 
| Tyreke Evans,Francisco García (18)
| Darnell Jackson (6)
| Tyreke Evans (7)
| Prudential Center13.482
| 1–1
|- bgcolor="#ccffcc"
| 3
| October 30
| @ Cleveland
| 
| Tyreke Evans (21)
| DeMarcus Cousins (10)
| Beno Udrih (11)
| Quicken Loans Arena20,562
| 2–1
|-

|- bgcolor="#ccffcc"
| 4
| November 1
| Toronto
| 
| Tyreke Evans (23)
| Samuel Dalembert (14)
| Tyreke Evans (5)
| ARCO Arena17,317
| 3–1
|- bgcolor="#ffcccc"
| 5
| November 3
| L.A. Lakers
| 
| Tyreke Evans (21)
| Samuel Dalembert,Jason Thompson (10)
| Beno Udrih (8)
| ARCO Arena16,113
| 3–2
|- bgcolor="#ffcccc"
| 6
| November 6
| Memphis
| 
| Tyreke Evans (30)
| Samuel Dalembert (12)
| Tyreke Evans (5)
| ARCO Arena14,085
| 3–3
|- bgcolor="#ffcccc"
| 7
| November 10
| Minnesota
| 
| Omri Casspi (17)
| Samuel Dalembert (9)
| Tyreke Evans,Beno Udrih (9)
| ARCO Arena12,433
| 3–4
|- bgcolor="#ffcccc"
| 8
| November 12
| @ Phoenix
| 
| Carl Landry (20)
| Carl Landry (11)
| Tyreke Evans (9)
| US Airways Center18,029
| 3–5
|- bgcolor="#ffcccc"
| 9
| November 14
| Detroit
| 
| Tyreke Evans (20)
| DeMarcus Cousins,Carl Landry (8)
| Beno Udrih (9)
| ARCO Arena12,377
| 3–6
|- bgcolor="#ffcccc"
| 10
| November 17
| New York
| 
| Tyreke Evans (23)
| DeMarcus Cousins (10)
| Tyreke Evans (5)
| ARCO Arena12,817
| 3–7
|- bgcolor="#ccffcc"
| 11
| November 19
| New Jersey
| 
| Tyreke Evans (20)
| DeMarcus Cousins (10)
| Tyreke Evans (4)
| ARCO Arena11,766
| 4–7
|- bgcolor="#ffcccc"
| 12
| November 21
| New Orleans
| 
| Donté Greene (15)
| Samuel Dalembert,Donté Greene (10)
| Tyreke Evans (5)
| ARCO Arena12,003
| 4–8
|- bgcolor="#ffcccc"
| 13
| November 22
| @ Utah
| 
| DeMarcus Cousins (18)
| DeMarcus Cousins,Samuel Dalembert (9)
| Tyreke Evans,Luther Head,Pooh Jeter (4)
| EnergySolutions Arena18,698
| 4–9
|- bgcolor="#ffcccc"
| 14
| November 25
| @ L.A. Clippers
| 
| Carl Landry (18)
| DeMarcus Cousins,Carl Landry (6)
| Luther Head (7)
| Staples Center11,504
| 4–10
|- bgcolor="#ffcccc"
| 15
| November 27
| Chicago
| 
| Jason Thompson (18)
| Jason Thompson (9)
| Tyreke Evans (9)
| ARCO Arena13,504
| 4–11
|- bgcolor="#ffcccc"
| 16
| November 30
| Indiana
| 
| Beno Udrih (24)
| Samuel Dalembert (12)
| Tyreke Evans (9)
| ARCO Arena10,927
| 4–12
|-

|- bgcolor="#ffcccc"
| 17
| December 3
| @ L.A. Lakers
| 
| Jason Thompson (19)
| Jason Thompson (10)
| Omri Casspi (4)
| Staples Center18,997
| 4–13
|- bgcolor="#ffcccc"
| 18
| December 4
| Dallas
| 
| Tyreke Evans (25)
| DeMarcus Cousins (11)
| Tyreke Evans (8)
| ARCO Arena12,900
| 4–14
|- bgcolor="#ffcccc"
| 19
| December 6
| @ L.A. Clippers
| 
| Omri Casspi (21)
| Samuel Dalembert (11)
| DeMarcus Cousins,Tyreke Evans,Beno Udrih (3)
| Staples Center14,964
| 4–15
|- bgcolor="#ccffcc"
| 20
| December 8
| Washington
| 
| Beno Udrih (23)
| Jason Thompson (14)
| Pooh Jeter (9)
| ARCO Arena12,308
| 5–15
|- bgcolor="#ffcccc"
| 21
| December 11
| Miami
| 
| Omri Casspi (20)
| Samuel Dalembert (11)
| Beno Udrih (7)
| ARCO Arena16,396
| 5–16
|- bgcolor="#ffcccc"
| 22
| December 14
| @ Houston
| 
| DeMarcus Cousins,Carl Landry (17)
| Jason Thompson (10)
| Pooh Jeter,Beno Udrih (6)
| Toyota Center13,414
| 5–17
|- bgcolor="#ffcccc"
| 23
| December 15
| @ New Orleans
| 
| Tyreke Evans (22)
| DeMarcus Cousins (7)
| Tyreke Evans (7)
| New Orleans Arena13,325
| 5–18
|- bgcolor="#ffcccc"
| 24
| December 17
| @ Oklahoma City
| 
| Tyreke Evans (22)
| DeMarcus Cousins (16)
| Tyreke Evans (6)
| Oklahoma City Arena18,203
| 5–19
|- bgcolor="#ffcccc"
| 25
| December 19
| Houston
| 
| DeMarcus Cousins (19)
| DeMarcus Cousins (8)
| Beno Udrih (7)
| ARCO Arena13,599
| 5–20
|- bgcolor="#ffcccc"
| 26
| December 21
| Golden State
| 
| Beno Udrih (34)
| DeMarcus Cousins (13)
| Tyreke Evans (7)
| ARCO Arena13,740
| 5–21
|- bgcolor="#ffcccc"
| 27
| December 23
| Milwaukee
| 
| Beno Udrih (17)
| Samuel Dalembert,Carl Landry (12)
| Beno Udrih (5)
| ARCO Arena12,360
| 5–22
|- bgcolor="#ffcccc"
| 28
| December 27
| L.A. Clippers
| 
| Tyreke Evans (32)
| DeMarcus Cousins (9)
| Beno Udrih (6)
| ARCO Arena14,590
| 5–23
|- bgcolor="#ccffcc"
| 29
| December 29
| Memphis
| 
| Beno Udrih (24)
| DeMarcus Cousins (16)
| Beno Udrih (6)
| ARCO Arena12,636
| 6–23
|-

|- bgcolor="#ffcccc"
| 30
| January 1
| @ Denver
| 
| Jason Thompson (17)
| DeMarcus Cousins (8)
| Tyreke Evans (5)
| Pepsi Center17,466
| 6–24
|- bgcolor="#ccffcc"
| 31
| January 2
| Phoenix
| 
| DeMarcus Cousins (28)
| Carl Landry (12)
| DeMarcus Cousins (6)
| ARCO Arena12,500
| 7–24
|- bgcolor="#ffcccc"
| 32
| January 4
| Atlanta
| 
| Tyreke Evans (29)
| Omri Casspi (11)
| Tyreke Evans (8)
| ARCO Arena11,472
| 7–25
|- bgcolor="#ccffcc"
| 33
| January 6
| Denver
| 
| Tyreke Evans (27)
| Omri Casspi,DeMarcus Cousins (6)
| Tyreke Evans (12)
| ARCO Arena13,184
| 8–25
|- bgcolor="#ffcccc"
| 34
| January 9
| @ Toronto
| 
| Beno Udrih (25)
| Jason Thompson (11)
| Pooh Jeter (6)
| Air Canada Centre17,206
| 8–26
|- bgcolor="#ffcccc"
| 35
| January 11
| @ Washington
| 
| Francisco García,Beno Udrih (26)
| Omri Casspi,DeMarcus Cousins (8)
| Pooh Jeter (11)
| Verizon Center16,226
| 8–27
|- bgcolor="#ffcccc"
| 36
| January 12
| @ Boston
| 
| Carl Landry (17)
| Jason Thompson (9)
| Beno Udrih (5)
| TD Garden18,624
| 8–28
|- bgcolor="#ccffcc"
| 37
| January 14
| @ New York
| 
| Beno Udrih (29)
| DeMarcus Cousins (10)
| Beno Udrih (4)
| Madison Square Garden19,763
| 9–28
|- bgcolor="#ffcccc"
| 38
| January 15
| @ Detroit
| 
| Tyreke Evans (25)
| DeMarcus Cousins (8)
| Tyreke Evans (11)
| The Palace of Auburn Hills18,784
| 9–29
|- bgcolor="#ffcccc"
| 39
| January 17
| @ Atlanta
| 
| DeMarcus Cousins (20)
| Donté Greene (11)
| Samuel Dalembert (4)
| Philips Arena14,820
| 9–30
|- bgcolor="#ffcccc"
| 40
| January 19
| Portland
| 
| Beno Udrih (20)
| Samuel Dalembert (12)
| Tyreke Evans (8)
| ARCO Arena12,722
| 9–31
|- bgcolor="#ffcccc"
| 41
| January 21
| @ Golden State
| 
| Tyreke Evans (35)
| Jason Thompson (12)
| Beno Udrih (7)
| Oracle Arena18,428
| 9–32
|- bgcolor="#ccffcc"
| 42
| January 24
| @ Portland
| 
| Tyreke Evans (26)
| DeMarcus Cousins,Carl Landry (8)
| Tyreke Evans (6)
| Rose Garden20,488
| 10–32
|- bgcolor="#ffcccc"
| 43
| January 25
| Charlotte
| 
| Tyreke Evans,Carl Landry (19)
| Omri Casspi,Tyreke Evans,Jason Thompson (8)
| Tyreke Evans (5)
| ARCO Arena13,984
| 10–33
|- bgcolor="#ccffcc"
| 44
| January 28
| @ L.A. Lakers
| 
| DeMarcus Cousins (27)
| DeMarcus Cousins,Carl Landry (10)
| Beno Udrih (7)
| Staples Center18,997
| 11–33
|- bgcolor="#ccffcc"
| 45
| January 29
| New Orleans
| 
| DeMarcus Cousins (25)
| DeMarcus Cousins (12)
| DeMarcus Cousins (7)
| ARCO Arena14,534
| 12–33
|-

|- bgcolor="#ffcccc"
| 46
| February 1
| Boston
| 
| DeMarcus Cousins,Tyreke Evans (20)
| Omri Casspi,Samuel Dalembert (7)
| Beno Udrih (6)
| ARCO Arena16,482
| 12–34
|- bgcolor="#ffcccc"
| 47
| February 4
| San Antonio
| 
| Tyreke Evans (25)
| DeMarcus Cousins (10)
| Pooh Jeter (6)
| ARCO Arena15,772
| 12–35
|- bgcolor="#ffcccc"
| 48
| February 7
| Utah
| 
| DeMarcus Cousins (25)
| DeMarcus Cousins (14)
| Tyreke Evans,Jason Thompson (4)
| ARCO Arena11,509
| 12–36
|- bgcolor="#ffcccc"
| 49
| February 9
| Dallas
| 
| Samuel Dalembert (20)
| DeMarcus Cousins (15)
| Tyreke Evans (9)
| ARCO Arena12,310
| 12–37
|- bgcolor="#ffcccc"
| 50
| February 12
| Oklahoma City
| 
| Tyreke Evans (30)
| DeMarcus Cousins (12)
| Beno Udrih (7)
| ARCO Arena14,987
| 12–38
|- bgcolor="#ccffcc"
| 51
| February 13
| @ Phoenix
| 
| Tyreke Evans (21)
| Samuel Dalembert (15)
| Tyreke Evans,Beno Udrih (7)
| US Airways Center17,798
| 13–38
|- bgcolor="#ffcccc"
| 52
| February 15
| @ Oklahoma City
| 
| DeMarcus Cousins (21)
| DeMarcus Cousins (13)
| Pooh Jeter (7)
| Oklahoma City Arena18,087
| 13–39
|- bgcolor="#ffcccc"
| 53
| February 16
| @ Dallas
| 
| Jermaine Taylor (17)
| DeMarcus Cousins (12)
| Beno Udrih (7)
| American Airlines Center20,420
| 13–40
|- align="center"
|colspan="9" bgcolor="#bbcaff"|All-Star Break
|- bgcolor="#ffcccc"
| 54
| February 22
| @ Miami
| 
| Samuel Dalembert (18)
| Samuel Dalembert (13)
| DeMarcus Cousins,Pooh Jeter,Beno Udrih (4)
| American Airlines Arena19,754
| 13–41
|- bgcolor="#ccffcc"
| 55
| February 23
| @ Orlando
| 
| Jermaine Taylor (21)
| Samuel Dalembert (9)
| Beno Udrih (10)
| Amway Center19,146
| 14–41
|- bgcolor="#ffcccc"
| 56
| February 25
| @ Charlotte
| 
| Samuel Dalembert (18)
| Jason Thompson (13)
| Beno Udrih (13)
| Time Warner Cable Arena15,782
| 14–42
|- bgcolor="#ffcccc"
| 57
| February 26
| @ Memphis
| 
| Beno Udrih (24)
| Omri Casspi,Samuel Dalembert (8)
| Jason Thompson,Beno Udrih (5)
| FedExForum16,028
| 14–43
|- bgcolor="#ccffcc"
| 58
| February 28
| L.A. Clippers
| 
| Marcus Thornton (29)
| Samuel Dalembert (10)
| Beno Udrih (7)
| ARCO Arena17,317
| 15–43
|-

|- bgcolor="#ffcccc"
| 59
| March 2
| Portland
| 
| DeMarcus Cousins (28)
| DeMarcus Cousins (11)
| Beno Udrih (8)
| Power Balance Pavilion12,286
| 15–44
|- bgcolor="#ffcccc"
| 60
| March 5
| @ Utah
| 
| Marcus Thornton (22)
| DeMarcus Cousins (18)
| DeMarcus Cousins (7)
| EnergySolutions Arena19,911
| 15–45
|- bgcolor="#ffcccc"
| 61
| March 7
| Houston
| 
| DeMarcus Cousins (20)
| Samuel Dalembert (12)
| Marcus Thornton,Beno Udrih (4)
| Power Balance Pavilion12,561
| 15–46
|- bgcolor="#ffcccc"
| 62
| March 9
| Orlando
| 
| DeMarcus Cousins (29)
| Samuel Dalembert (10)
| Marcus Thornton (5)
| Power Balance Pavilion12,728
| 15–47
|- bgcolor="#ffcccc"
| 63
| March 11
| @ San Antonio
| 
| Omri Casspi,Jermaine Taylor (16)
| DeMarcus Cousins (11)
| Marcus Thornton (6)
| AT&T Center18,712
| 15–48
|- bgcolor="#ffcccc"
| 64
| March 12
| @ New Orleans
| 
| Marcus Thornton (25)
| DeMarcus Cousins (11)
| Pooh Jeter (7)
| New Orleans Arena15,530
| 15–49
|- bgcolor="#ccffcc"
| 65
| March 14
| Golden State
| 
| Marcus Thornton (42)
| Samuel Dalembert (16)
| Beno Udrih (9)
| Power Balance Pavilion14,243
| 16–49
|- bgcolor="#ffcccc"
| 66
| March 16
| Cleveland
| 
| Marcus Thornton (23)
| DeMarcus Cousins (16)
| Beno Udrih (8)
| Power Balance Pavilion13,477
| 16–50
|- bgcolor="#ffcccc"
| 67
| March 18
| Philadelphia
| 
| DeMarcus Cousins (19)
| Samuel Dalembert (13)
| Beno Udrih (5)
| Power Balance Pavilion15,373
| 16–51
|- bgcolor="#ccffcc"
| 68
| March 20
| @ Minnesota
| 
| Samuel Dalembert (26)
| Samuel Dalembert (17)
| Marcus Thornton (9)
| Target Center18,993
| 17–51
|- bgcolor="#ffcccc"
| 69
| March 21
| @ Chicago
| 
| Marcus Thornton (25)
| DeMarcus Cousins (8)
| Beno Udrih (5)
| United Center21,873
| 17–52
|- bgcolor="ccffcc"
| 70
| March 23
| @ Milwaukee
| 
| Marcus Thornton (27)
| Samuel Dalembert (12)
| Beno Udrih (6)
| Bradley Center14,122
| 18–52
|- bgcolor="#ccffcc"
| 71
| March 25
| @ Indiana
| 
| DeMarcus Cousins (18)
| DeMarcus Cousins (14)
| Tyreke Evans (8)
| Conseco Fieldhouse13,813
| 19–52
|- bgcolor="#ccffcc"
| 72
| March 27
| @ Philadelphia
| 
| Marcus Thornton (32)
| Samuel Dalembert (19)
| DeMarcus Cousins (6)
| Wells Fargo Center16,235
| 20–52
|- bgcolor="#ccffcc"
| 73
| March 29
| Phoenix
| 
| Marcus Thornton (24)
| Marcus Thornton (11)
| DeMarcus Cousins,Tyreke Evans (8)
| Power Balance Pavilion13,774
| 21–52
|- bgcolor="#ffcccc"
| 74
| March 30
| @ Denver
| 
| Marcus Thornton (27)
| Samuel Dalembert,Jason Thompson (6)
| Beno Udrih (10)
| Pepsi Center17,955
| 21–53
|-

|- bgcolor="#ffcccc"
| 75
| April 1
| Denver
| 
| Francisco García (17)
| Samuel Dalembert (12)
| DeMarcus Cousins,Marcus Thornton (5)
| Power Balance Pavilion15,871
| 21–54
|- bgcolor="#ccffcc"
| 76
| April 3
| Utah
| 
| Tyreke Evans (24)
| DeMarcus Cousins (9)
| Tyreke Evans (10)
| Power Balance Pavilion17,215
| 22–54
|- bgcolor="#ccffcc"
| 77
| April 5
| @ Houston
| 
| Samuel Dalembert,Marcus Thornton (21)
| DeMarcus Cousins,Samuel Dalembert (15)
| Tyreke Evans (5)
| Toyota Center15,523
| 23–54
|- bgcolor="#ffcccc"
| 78
| April 6
| @ San Antonio
| 
| Tyreke Evans (16)
| DeMarcus Cousins (11)
| Tyreke Evans,Beno Udrih (5)
| AT&T Center18,590
| 23–55
|- bgcolor="#ffcccc"
| 79
| April 8
| @ Memphis
| 
| Marcus Thornton (18)
| Samuel Dalembert (16)
| Tyreke Evans (6)
| FedExForum16,517
| 23–56
|- bgcolor="#ccffcc"
| 80
| April 10
| @ Golden State
| 
| Marcus Thornton (21)
| Samuel Dalembert (14)
| Beno Udrih (6)
| Oracle Arena19,596
| 24–56
|- bgcolor="#ffcccc"
| 81
| April 11
| Oklahoma City
| 
| DeMarcus Cousins (30)
| DeMarcus Cousins,Samuel Dalembert,Marcus Thornton (9)
| Beno Udrih (7)
| Power Balance Pavilion15,683
| 24–57
|- bgcolor="#ffcccc"
| 82
| April 13
| L.A. Lakers
| 
| Marcus Thornton (33)
| Samuel Dalembert (18)
| Tyreke Evans (7)
| Power Balance Pavilion17,641
| 24–58
|-

Player statistics

Season

Awards, records and milestones

Awards

Week/Month

All-Star

Season

Records

Milestones

Injuries and surgeries

Transactions

Trades

Free agents

|}

References

Sacramento Kings seasons
Sacramento
Sacramento
Sacramento